Sugaentulus is a genus of proturans in the family Acerentomidae.

Species
 Sugaentulus andrzeji Shrubovych & Rusek, 2010
 Sugaentulus masumii Imadaté, 1978

References

Protura